Cilly Aussem defeated Betty Nuthall 8–6, 6–1 in the final to win the women's singles tennis title at the 1931 French Championships.

Seeds
The seeded players are listed below. Cilly Aussem is the champion; others show the round in which they were eliminated.

 Cilly Aussem (champion)
 Simonne Mathieu (quarterfinals)
 Helen Jacobs (quarterfinals)
 Lilly De Alvarez (semifinals)
 Elizabeth Ryan (quarterfinals)
 Betty Nuthall (finalist)
 Hilde Krahwinkel (semifinals)
 Joan Ridley (third round)

Draw

Key
 Q = Qualifier
 WC = Wild card
 LL = Lucky loser
 r = Retired

Finals

Earlier rounds

Section 1

Section 2

Section 3

Section 4

References

External links
 

1931 in women's tennis
1931
1931 in French women's sport
1931 in French tennis